Antanifotsy  is a district in Vakinankaratra Region, Madagascar. The district has a total population estimated to 354.933 in 2018. The seat of the district administration is the town of Antanifotsy.

Communes
The district is further divided into 14 communes:

 Ambatolahy
 Ambatomiady
 Ambatotsipihina
 Ambodiriana
 Ambohimandroso
 Ambohitompoina
 Ampitatafika
 Andranofito
 Anjamanga
 Antanifotsy
 Antsahalava
 Antsampandrano
 Belanitra
 Soamanandrariny

References

Districts of Vakinankaratra